Marc-Kanyan Case (14 September 1942 – 6 January 2023) was a French professional footballer. He competed in the men's tournament at the 1968 Summer Olympics.

References

External links
 

1942 births
2023 deaths
People from the Loyalty Islands
New Caledonian footballers
New Caledonia international footballers
French footballers
Olympic footballers of France
France international footballers
Footballers at the 1968 Summer Olympics
Association football forwards
Mediterranean Games gold medalists for France
Mediterranean Games medalists in football
Competitors at the 1967 Mediterranean Games
Ligue 1 players
SC Bastia players
Nîmes Olympique players
Gazélec Ajaccio players